Erdem Başçı (born 1966) is a Turkish economist and the former Governor of the Central Bank of the Republic of Turkey in 2010s.

Early life
He was born in 1966 in Ankara. After finishing the high school at TED Ankara College in 1983, Erdem Başçı was educated in electrical engineering at the Middle East Technical University (ODTÜ), and graduated 1987 with a bachelor's degree. He received master's degrees in 1989 in business administration, and in 1990 in economics from Bilkent University, and in 1993 in economics from the Johns Hopkins University. In 1995, Erdem Başçı earned a PhD degree in economics from Bilkent University.

He served between 1995 and 2003 as a member of the teaching staff at the Bilkent University, from 1999 on as an associate professor of economics.

Career
Başçı was appointed deputy governor of the Central Bank of Turkey on 9 October 2003. He was reconfirmed at this post on 10 October 2008. Erdem Başçı was appointed governor on 14 April 2011, succeeding Durmuş Yılmaz.

After ending his official five-year term, Başçı was succeeded on 19 April 2016 by his deputy Murat Çetinkaya.

References

1966 births
Turkish economists
Turkish civil servants
Governors of the Central Bank of Turkey
Living people
TED Ankara College Foundation Schools alumni
Middle East Technical University alumni
Bilkent University alumni
Johns Hopkins University alumni
Academic staff of Bilkent University
Turkish electrical engineers
People from Ankara